The Glenn Warner Soccer Facility is a soccer-specific stadium at the United States Naval Academy in Annapolis, Maryland. The college soccer facility is named for beloved longtime coach Glenn Warner. It was the site of Crystal Palace Baltimore's first-ever match, a 3–1 loss to its parent club on July 15, 2006.

Anders Hall of Honor
See: Navy Midshipmen men's soccer#Anders Hall of Honor

See also
Navy Midshipmen men's soccer
Navy Midshipmen#Facilities
Turf management

External links
Glenn Warner Soccer Facility webpage (NavySports.com)

College soccer venues in the United States
Soccer venues in Maryland
Sports venues in Maryland
Navy Midshipmen sports venues
Sports venues completed in 2002
2002 establishments in Maryland
United States Naval Academy buildings and structures